Morobo County is a county in the Central Equatoria, South Sudan.
 Morobo County borders Uganda and Congo.

The county is mainly occupied by Kakwa speaking people, Keliko and Lugbara. The people in Morobo are farmers doing local farming mostly for food and some for sale. Morobo is part of the green belt and also acts as the food busket for yei  and juba of South Sudan.

There has been sporadic violence in Morobo County since the end of the establishment of South Sudan at the end of the Second Sudanese Civil War. The UN is working with local people to address these issues.

Joseph Mawa is the current commissioner of Morobo County.

Demography

Payams of Morobo 
Morobo county  is located in central equatoria state and its close to Demoractic republic of congo and Uganda as it boarders,having five Payams of Lujule Payam  Gulumbi Payam, Wudabi  Payam,Kimba Payam and Panyume  Payam and each  Payam consist of Bomas

Gulumbi 

 Kendila boma
 Kilikil boma
 Girili boma

Kimba 
1.Kaya boma

2.Yondu boma

3 Kimba boma

Lujule West 
1.Kembe boma

2.Yugufe boma

3.Kendre boma

Panyume

Wudabi 
Nyei Boma 

Aluto Boma 

Geri Boma

Economy and livelihood 
Morobo County is located in the state of Central Equatoria. It is bounded to the north-west by Yei County, to the north-east by Lainya County, to the south-east by Uganda, and to the south-west by the Democratic Republic of the Congo.

The county is located in South Sudan's greenbelt and has fertile soil, making it an ideal location for agricultural activities. Morobo County, according to FEWSNET (2018), is in the equatorial maize and cassava livelihoods zone. Groundnuts, sorghum, milt, banana, cassava, and maize are among the most common and marketable crops grown in the region, but farmers frequently struggle to obtain quality seeds due to trade and transportation issues.

A REACH assessment in 2018 revealed that while 88% of the population had access to a functional market, 100% of the population was estimated to be receiving food aid, and 88% relied on subsistence agriculture to support their households. Furthermore, families in the area reported eating one meal per day on average. Due to "unsafe access to land," half of the population was reported to be food insecure. Aside from agricultural occupations, half of the population reported owning cattle. The county is also well-known for mineral extraction in South Sudan. According to a Cordaid report published in 2016, there were approximately 5,000 artisanal gold miners operating in the area, but it is unclear how much of this number has been impacted by the conflict.

Infrastructure and services 
Morobo County is located on the border with Uganda, making it a vital area for both human migration and trade. Kaya is one of the county's unofficial migration points. However, insufficient infrastructure, particularly roads and affordable transportation options, limits Morobo residents' ability to expand their agricultural activities to commercial levels. Residents' ability to access their land for subsistence agricultural livelihoods has also been hampered by the area's insecurity. Insecurity in the area, particularly in 2017, has resulted in the deterioration of schools, clinics, and homes, as well as the destruction of crops.

According to OCHA's (2019) Humanitarian Needs Overview for 2020, Morobo County has an estimated 81,200 people in need, which is approximately 78% of the estimated population reported in the HNO. According to the same report, Morobo County has the highest level of recorded landmine and explosive remnants of war, which have proliferated as a result of the recent conflict in the Equatoria region. This is especially problematic given the high number of IDP border crossings in the area. Landmines have also made it difficult for residents to access basic services in the area, such as healthcare and schools.

Conflict dynamics 
Prior to 2016, Morobo County had avoided the worst of the national conflict and was regarded as one of the most stable areas in the country. Armed militia robberies, on the other hand, were common and sometimes deadly. Because of its proximity to Uganda and the Democratic Republic of the Congo, the county is home to a large number of South Sudanese returnees from those countries. Due to border demarcation disputes, there was some tension between communities on both sides of the border with the DRC. According to local media reports, a conflict between residents near the border sparked by the alleged raising of DRC flags in Morobo villages was referred to the national government in May 2016. (Gilbert, 2016). When conflict erupted for the second time in 2016, Morobo County was one of the areas in Central Equatoria where opposition forces fled and remained.

According to VOA (2019), civilians were targeted by armed forces in addition to being caught in the crossfire between government and opposition forces. Attacks on humanitarian workers have also occurred in Morobo. Two aid workers were killed in April 2016 near Gulumbi Village. Armed groups kidnapped and killed three IOM staff monitoring the border for Ebola in Kaya, Morobo County, in October 2019. (IOM, 2019). This resulted in the indefinite suspension of border monitoring. Despite the signing of the R-ARCISS in 2018, the National Salvation Front (NAS), a non-signatory to the agreement, continues to operate in the area, causing insecurity in the county.

Administration and logistics 
Payams: Kimba (County Headquarters), Gulumbi, Lujule, Panyume, Wudabi

Main roads:

 One primary and one secondary road connects Morobo town to Yei Town to its north, however, it is noted with a “road warning” that the road is passable with difficulties even during the dry season. 
 Morobo county has one community radio station known as morobo FM since 2013 as a means of sharing public related informations in the heart of south sudan.

References

External links 
 https://unmiss.unmissions.org/sites/default/files/final_-_human_rights_division_report_on_central_equatoria_-_3_july_2019.pdf
 https://reliefweb.int/sites/reliefweb.int/files/resources/reach_ssd_factsheet_food_security_and_livelihoods_in_greater_equatoria_july_2018.pdf
 https://fscluster.org/sites/default/files/documents/south_sudan_-_humanitarian_needs_overview_2020.pdf
 https://iomsouthsudan.org/tracking/sites/default/publicfiles/documents/CES_Morobo_Atlas.pdf
 https://www.cordaid.org/en/wp-content/uploads/sites/3/2016/03/South_Sudan_Gold_Mining_Report-LR-1.pdf
 https://www.cordaid.org/en/wp-content/uploads/sites/3/2016/03/South_Sudan_Gold_Mining_Report-LR-1.pdf

Counties of South Sudan
Central Equatoria